The Busoga Masaza Cup is an annual football tournament in Uganda that was revived in 2016 by His royal highness Kyabazinga Gabula Nadiope IV.

The Masaza tournament is organised by the ministry of sports, Busoga Kingdom.

Up to 14 teams from the 11 chiefdoms that make Busoga Kingdom participate in the Masaza Cup Tournament. These include; Bugabula, Butembe, Budiope, Bugweri, Kigulu, Luuka, Bulamogi, Bukono, Bunha, Bunhole Bunhanhumba, Bukooli Bugiri, Bukooli Namayingo, Buzaaya, and Busiki.

The first edition of this tournament was played in 2016. The finals were held in Kyabazinga stadium Bugembe. In attendance was HRH Kyabazinga Gabula Nadiope, and FUFA president Moses Magogo. This was followed by a second round in 2017.

Kigulu won the tournament twice.

The tournament attracted sponsors including City Tyres, MTN, Baba TV, Baba FM, Mayuge Sugar, and Nile special.

Due to the impacts of COVID-19, the Masaza Cup Tournament was interrupted until 2022.

The finals of the 5th edition were held on 17 September 2022 at Kyabazinga Stadium Bugembe

Bukhooli-Namayingo FC won the 2022 Busoga Cup 1-0 against Kigulu FC.

Winners 
 2016 Bukooli North won Bunha 3-1
 2017 Butembe beat Bunha 4-3 on penalties after the normal play ended 1-1
 2018 Kigulu won Butembe on penalties 5-4 following a goalless draw
 2019 Kigulu won Bunha 1-0
 2022 Bukooli Namayingo won Kigulu 1-0

References 

Football competitions in Uganda